John Joughin is a British literary scholar, specialising in Shakespearean studies, and the ex Vice-Chancellor of the University of East London.

See also
List of Chancellors and Vice-Chancellors of British universities

References

Academics of the University of East London
Living people
Year of birth missing (living people)
Place of birth missing (living people)